The Diocese of Cork and Ross is a Roman Catholic diocese in southern Ireland, one of six suffragan dioceses in the ecclesiastical province of Cashel and Emly.

The cathedral church of the diocese is Cathedral of St Mary and St Anne in Cork city.

The incumbent bishop of the diocese is Fintan Gavin.

History

Diocese of Cork (1111-1429) 

The original Diocese of Cork was established by the Synod of Ráth Breasail in 1111, but was reduced in size by the establishment of separate Dioceses of Cloyne and Ross at the Synod of Kells in 1152.

Diocese of Cork and Cloyne (14291748) 

On petition of King Edward II, Pope John XXII issued a papal bull for the union of the Dioceses of Cork and Cloyne on 30 July 1326, with effect from the death of either bishop. The union should have taken effect on the death of Philip of Slane in 1327, but bishops were still appointed to both dioceses.

The dioceses were eventually united on the episcopal appointment of Jordan Purcell on 15 June 1429, following their impoverishment from the robbery of church property by the nobility.

From 1693 to 1747, the Bishop of Cork and Cloyne was also the apostolic administrator of the Diocese of Ross.

Diocese of Cork (17481958) 
Following a decree by Pope Benedict XIV on 10 December 1747, the Diocese of Cork was reconstituted as a stand-alone entity, while the Diocese of Cloyne was united with Ross.

Diocese of Cork and Ross (1958present) 
The modern-day Diocese of Cork and Ross was formed by an ex aequo principaliter union of the Dioceses of Cork and Ross on 19 April 1958.

Parish Assemblies and Parish Pastoral Councils are involved in running the parishes in the diocese. The diocese runs a number of adult faith development programmes, such as the Rite of Christian Initiation of Adults. With the Cork Scripture Group and the neighbouring Diocese of Cloyne, the diocese also offers a Diocesan Certificate in Biblical Studies.

Geography
The diocese is divided into 67 parishes, all of which are in County Cork. 56 parishes were part of the former Diocese of Cork, while 11 were part of the Diocese of Ross. The diocesan boundary with the neighbouring Diocese of Cloyne roughly follows the course of the River Lee.

The parishes are grouped into sixteen "families of parishes", twelve of which came into effect on 10 September 2022, in which each priest will be resident in one parish but ministering across the entire family of parishes, and greater opportunities will exist for lay participation and shared leadership.

Aside from the cathedral city of Cork and the co-cathedral town of Skibbereen, the main towns in the diocese are Bandon, Carrigaline, Carrigtwohill, Clonakilty and Kinsale.

The following parishes will be restructured into four Families of Parishes in 2023.

Ordinaries

The following is a list of bishops since the unification of the Dioceses of Cork and Ross in 1958:
 Cornelius Lucey (19521980)
 Michael Murphy (19801996)
 John Buckley (19972019)
 Fintan Gavin (2019present)

See also
 Catholic Church in Ireland
Diocese of Cork
Diocese of Ross
Church of Ireland Diocese of Cork, Cloyne and Ross

References

Bibliography

  pp. 211–212. (in Latin)

External links
Catholic Hierarchy
GCatholic

 
1958 establishments in Ireland
Roman Catholic dioceses and prelatures established in the 20th century
Religion in County Cork
Organisations based in Cork (city)
Roman Catholic Ecclesiastical Province of Cashel